Jason Allan Antoon (born November 9, 1971) is an American actor.

Personal life
Antoon was born in Santa Monica, California. He is of Lebanese descent. Antoon has been married to actress Seana Kofoed since 2010; they have two children.

Career

Stage
Antoon is best known for his role in the 2000 Tony Award-winning musical Contact. For his performance, he received a Drama Desk Award nomination for Outstanding Supporting Actor in a Musical.

Film and television
Among his television work, Antoon starred on the short-lived TV series Kings, in addition to numerous guest roles on various programs such as Modern Family in the episode Game Changer. On the big screen, he had a featured role in Minority Report, cast when Steven Spielberg discovered him in Contact. In 2008, he had a cameo in Taking Woodstock and he was seen in two 2010 George Gallo films, Columbus Circle and Middle Men. Antoon voiced the role of Garrison "Knobs" Butler in the web series Electric City, and portrayed 35-year-old struggling actor Alowisus Hewson who is a vampire in the web series Vamped Out. He has a supporting role on the TNT drama Claws, playing Dr. Ken Brickman. In 2021 he began appearing as regular cast member Ernie Malik, on NCIS: Hawai'i.

Filmography

Film

Television

References

External links
 
 
 
 

1971 births
Living people
American male film actors
American male stage actors
American male television actors
American people of Lebanese descent
Carnegie Mellon University alumni
Male actors from California
People from Santa Monica, California